Henryk Szumski (6 April 1941 – 30 January 2012) was a Polish general, Chief of the General Staff of the Polish Armed Forces between 1997 and 2000.

Life

Education
He is a graduate of the Military Academy of the Armored Forces in Poznań (1961–1964). Between 1968 and 1971 he participated in courses organised by the General Staff Academy in Rembertów. In 1980 he graduated from General Staff Academy of Soviet Armed Forces.

Military career 
After graduation in 1980 he became the commander of the  12th Mechanised Division in Szczecin. In the years 1984-1986 Szumski was serving as chief of Pomeranian Military District. Subsequently, he took the position of deputy chief of General Staff of Polish Armed Forces for Operations. Between 1987-1989 he was a commander of Silesian Military District. Till 1996 Szumski held various high positions within the General Staff. 

From 1996 to 1997 he worked at National Security Bureau where he was i.a. responsible for conceptual works on new model of Poland’s Armed Forces. 

On 10 march 1997 he was appointed by Polish President Aleksander Kwaśniewski as Chief of the General Staff of the Polish Armed Forces. He held this position till 28 September 2000. 

In 2000 he left the army and became a member of National Security Council.

Death 
He died tragically on 30 January 2012 after being attacked with a knife by his own son. 

On 9 February 2012 Henryk Szumski was buried with military honours at the Powązki Military Cemetery in Warsaw.

References 

Polish generals
1941 births
2012 deaths
Burials at Powązki Military Cemetery